Pieter van Waas (30 December 1878 – 21 March 1962) was a Dutch sports shooter. He competed in the 300 metre free rifle event at the 1908 Summer Olympics.

References

1878 births
1962 deaths
Dutch male sport shooters
Olympic shooters of the Netherlands
Shooters at the 1908 Summer Olympics
Sportspeople from Rotterdam